Gérard Rondeau (1953 – September 13, 2016) was a French photographer. He took photographs of World War I battlefields in his native Marne, the Reims cathedral, and black-and-white portraits of celebrities and authors. His photography was exhibited both in France and internationally. He was the recipient of an award for his work. He was the illustrator of over 20 non-fiction books.

Early life
Gérard Rondeau was born in 1953 in Chalons-sur-Marne (now known as Chalons-en-Champagne) in France. His parents were schoolteachers.

Career
Rondeau worked at the Alliance Française in Colombo, Sri Lanka, in the 1970s. He was inspired by a collection photography of Henri Cartier-Bresson he found in their library. He first took photographs of the Reims cathedral and battlefields from World War I in his native Marne. He was best known for his black and white portraits of celebrities and authors. Over the years, he took photographs of celebrities including Iggy Pop, Clint Eastwood, Peter Falk, Christian Louboutin, Serge Reggiani, Christian Lacroix, Jean Paul Gaultier, Geraldine Chaplin, Isabella Rossellini, Paul Bowles, Alain Bashung, Pierre Soulages, Jacques Derrida and Jim Jarmusch.

His photography was exhibited at the Grand Palais and the Maison européenne de la photographie in Paris. It was also exhibited at the Martin-Gropius-Bau in Berlin; Musée de l'Élysée in Lausanne, Switzerland; the National Gallery of Indonesia in Jakarta, as well as other museums in Rome, Sarajevo, and New York City.

Rondeau was the author of more than fifteen books. He travelled to Yugoslavia with Médecins du Monde during the wars of the 1990s, and later published his diary about his experience. Many of his photographs were published in Le Monde over the course of 20 years.

Rondeau was the recipient of the Best Multimedia Award from the Globes de Cristal Award in 2007.

Personal life and death
Rondeau resided near Trélou-sur-Marne in Aisne, Picardy. He died of cancer on September 13, 2016, at the Henri Mondor Hospital in Créteil, Val-de-Marne. He was 63.

Works

References

External links

Official website

1953 births
2016 deaths
People from Châlons-en-Champagne
People from Aisne
French photographers
French diarists
Deaths from cancer in France